Crescent Hill is an unincorporated community in Bates County, in the U.S. state of Missouri.

History
A post office called Crescent Hill was established in 1858 and remained in operation until 1880. The community was named for its lofty elevation atop Crescent Hill.

References

Unincorporated communities in Bates County, Missouri
Unincorporated communities in Missouri